Panyu Square station  is a station of Line 3, Line 18 and Line 22 of the Guangzhou Metro. Line 3 started operation on 30December 2006, Line 18 started operation on 28September 2021 and Line 22 started operation on 31March 2022.

The station is located under the junction of Donghuan Road and East Qinghe Road in the Shiqiao Subdistrict, in Panyu District, Guangzhou. Panyu Square is a newly developed area to the south of Shiqiao, surrounded by the new Panyu District Government Building, hotel and high-rise buildings.

Since 16 April 2022, to provide easier access for passengers going from Line 22 in the direction of Xiancun on Line 18, all Line 22 trains now only use platform 5, and platform 6 has been taken out of use as a reserved platform. Passengers for Wanqingsha on Line 18 will have to pass through the transfer concourse to reach platform 4. Nevertheless, the arrangement has been canceled since 20 August 2022.

Station layout

Exits

References

Railway stations in China opened in 2006
Guangzhou Metro stations in Panyu District